Shelton  may refer to:

Places

United Kingdom
Shelton, North Bedfordshire, in the parish of Dean and Shelton, Bedfordshire
Lower Shelton, in the parish of Marston Moretaine, Bedfordshire
Upper Shelton, in the parish of Marston Moretaine, Bedfordshire
Shelton, Norfolk
Shelton, Nottinghamshire
Shelton, Shropshire
Shelton, Stoke-on-Trent, Staffordshire

United States
Shelton, Connecticut
Shelton, Washington

People

Surname

General
 Alfred Shelton (1865–1923), English international footballer
 Anne Shelton (courtier) (1475–1555), aunt of Anne Boleyn and mother of Henry VIII's mistress, Mary Shelton; wife of Sir John Shelton
 George M. Shelton (1877–1949), Philippine–American War Medal of Honor recipient
 Herbert M. Shelton (1895–1985), Prominent American health educator, pacifist, vegetarian, and advocate of raw foodism and fasting cures
 Hugh Shelton (born 1942), retired US Army four-star general and former Chairman of the Joint Chiefs of Staff
 Ian Shelton (born 1957), Canadian astronomer
 Sir John Shelton (1476/7–1539), head of the household of the future Queen Elizabeth I of England
 John Shelton (courtier) (c.1503–1558), controller and governor to the royal children of Henry VIII's court
 John M. Shelton (1853–1923), American rancher and banker
 Judy Shelton
 Lee Shelton (1865–1912), convicted murderer mentioned in song as "Stagger Lee"
 Nicole Shelton, American academic
 Ronnie Shelton (1961–2018), the "West Side Rapist", American serial rapist
 Ruth Gaines-Shelton (1872-1934), American educator and writer
 Sandra Shelton, American economist
 Thomas Shelton (stenographer) (1600/01–1650(?))
 Thomas Shelton (translator) (fl. 1612–1620), British translator of Cervantes
 William L. Shelton (born 1954), US Air Force lieutenant general
 Winston L. Shelton (1922–2019), American businessman and inventor

Arts
 Ann Shelton (photographer) (born 1967), New Zealand photographer
 Anne Shelton (singer) (1923–1994), British singer
 Blake Shelton (born 1976), American country singer
 Deborah Shelton (born 1948), US-American actress and star of US soap Dallas
 Gilbert Shelton (born 1940), US-American comic artist
 Marley Shelton (born 1974), American actress, sibling of Samantha
 Mary Shelton (1510/15–1570/71), lady-in-waiting, poet and mistress of Henry VIII of England
 Peter L. Shelton (1945–2012), architect and interior designer
 Richard Shelton (writer) (born 1933), US-American poet and author
 Ron Shelton (born 1945), US-American film director
 Roscoe Shelton (1931–2002), American electric blues and R&B singer
 Samantha Shelton (born 1978), American actress, sibling of Marley
 Tracey Shelton, Australian photojournalist
 Ricky Van Shelton (born 1952), US-American country music singer

Politicians
 Amanda Shelton, Guamanian politician
 Mark M. Shelton (born 1956), American pediatrician and politician
 Shelly M. Shelton, Republican member of the Nevada Assembly

Sports
 Anthony Shelton (born 1967), American football player
 Ben Shelton (tennis) (born 2002), American tennis player
 Chris Shelton (baseball player) (born 1980), American baseball player for the Texas Rangers
 Coleman Shelton (born 1995), American football player
 Derek Shelton (born 1970), American baseball coach
 Ernie Shelton (born 1932), American high jumper
 Ian Shelton (footballer) (born 1940), Australian rules footballer with Essendon Football Club
 Lonnie Shelton (1955–2018), American basketball player
 Luton Shelton (1985-2021), Jamaican footballer
 Skeeter Shelton (1888–1954), American baseball player and coach

Fictional characters
 Sgt. Brett C. Shelton, the bullying Sgt. in Child's Play 3, played by Travis Fine
 Harriet Shelton in the British soap opera Doctors, played by Carley Stenson

Given name 
 Shelton Benjamin (born 1975), American wrestler
 Gamini Fonseka (Sembuge Gamini Shelton Fonseka) (1936-2004), Sri Lankan actor, director, and politician
 Shelton Gibson (born 1994), American football player
 D. Shelton A. Gunaratne (1940-2019), American academic
 Shelton Jayasinghe (1922-1978), Sri Lankan Sinhala Cabinet Minister
 Shelton Payagala (1944-2009), Sri Lankan film director and writer
 Shelton Perera (1939-1986), Sri Lankan tabla player, vocalist, and composer
 Shelton Ranaraja (1926-2011), Sri Lankan Sinhala lawyer and deputy minister
 Dudley Shelton Senanayaka (1911-1973), Sri Lankan politician who served as Prime Minister in three instances
 Shelton Hank Williams (born 1972), American musician
 Spike Lee (born 1957 as Shelton Jackson Lee), American filmmaker

Other uses
Shelton High School (disambiguation)
5953 Shelton, an asteroid
Shelton Abbey Prison, near Arklow, County Wicklow, Ireland
Shelton Hospital, former county asylum in Shelton, Shropshire, England
Shelton Oak, a tree near Shrewsbury, England
USS Shelton, any of two United States Navy ships
The Shelton, a historic apartment building in Indianapolis, Indiana, US
Shelton, a code name during development for a variant of the Pentium M without any level 2 cache, in the Celeron brand

See also
 Sheldon (disambiguation)
 Shilton (disambiguation)
 Skelton (disambiguation)